Chushka may refer to:

Chushka Spit
Chushka (rural locality)